The Cotton Patch is a breed of domestic goose originating in the Southern United States. It is so named because it traditionally was used to weed fields of cotton, corn, and other crops.

History
Up until the 1950s, Cotton Patch geese were customarily kept on rural Southern homesteads and farms as multi-purpose poultry used for weeding, meat, eggs, down, and grease. Their grazing kept fields clear of crabgrass and other weeds, while leaving crops unharmed and reducing the amount of manual labor necessary. After the mid-20th century, herbicides almost entirely replaced weeding on American farms, and the Cotton Patch goose declined in concert. Considered critically endangered by the American Livestock Breeds Conservancy, the Society for the Preservation of Poultry Antiquities, and the American Poultry Association, it has largely disappeared from the Southern farms where it was once common. It is also included in Slow Food USA's Ark of Taste, a catalog of heritage foods in danger of extinction.

Characteristics
The Cotton Patch goose is particularly well-adapted to the climate of the southeastern U.S., being more heat tolerant. They are also slimmer in body than most domestic geese, and retain a relatively good flying ability into adulthood. They much more closely resemble the wild forebears of domestic geese,  the greylag goose. They are similar in color to the Pilgrim Goose and Shetland Goose, and are also sexually dimorphic. In general, ganders are white with some dove gray feathers on the back and tail. Females are either entirely gray, or pied gray and white, also called saddleback. The bills and feet are pink rather than orange, as is seen in the Pilgrim, which it resembles.  They range in weight from 8-10 pounds for geese and 9-12 pounds for ganders.

See also
 List of goose breeds

References
 
 
   
 

Goose breeds originating in the United States
Conservation Priority Breeds of the Livestock Conservancy
Goose breeds